This is a list of notable graduates and faculty members of the Tokyo Institute of Technology in Japan.

Politics
Naoto Kan – 94th Prime Minister of Japan (2010-2011)
Yukio Hatoyama – former Assistant Professor; 93rd Prime Minister of Japan (2009–2010)
Tadamichi Yamamoto - UN Special Representative of the Secretary-General for Afghanistan

Sciences
Yoshinori Ohsumi – Nobel laureate (Medicine, 2016)
Hideki Shirakawa (BSc 1961, PhD 1966) – Nobel laureate (Chemistry, 2000)
Toshikazu Sunada – mathematician who contributed to various fields in geometry, including spectral geometry, Reinhardt domain, Ihara zeta function, and periodic graph)

Engineering
Toshitada Doi – robot Aibo pioneer, co-inventor of compact disc
 Nobutaro Hara – model railway builder whose collection is displayed at the Hara Model Railway Museum
Shōji Hayashi – architect, chairman of Japan Institute of Architects
Shigeo Hirose – pioneer of robotics technology
Junichi Iijima – Professor of the Department of Industrial Management and Engineering
Satoru Iwata – former game developer at HAL Laboratories; former CEO of Nintendo
Heitaro Nakajima – digital audio pioneer
Hiroshi Takahashi – architect
 Jiro Tanaka – aircraft and automotive engineer

Business
Shoji Hamada – potter, Living National Treasure of Japan
Kanjiro Kawai – potter, refused Living National Treasure designation
Akitoshi Kawazu – game producer, creator of Final Fantasy Crystal Chronicles
Kenichi Ohmae – business and corporate strategist
Kazuo Shinohara – architect, former professor
Takaaki Yoshimoto – poet, literary critic, philosopher

References

Tokyo Institute of Technology

Tokyo Institute of Tech